William Rabb Beatty (June 11, 1851 – February 8, 1905) was an Ontario businessman and political figure. He represented Parry Sound in the Legislative Assembly of Ontario as a Liberal-Patrons of Industry member from 1894 to 1898 and as a Liberal from 1898 to 1902.

He was the manager for the Beatty Line, a steamship company operating on the Great Lakes. His brother Walter Beatty also served in the provincial assembly. Beatty lived in Parry Sound.

External links 
The Canadian parliamentary companion, 1897 JA Gemmill

1851 births
1905 deaths
Ontario Liberal Party MPPs
People from Parry Sound, Ontario